Harveysburg is an unincorporated community in Millcreek Township, Fountain County, Indiana, United States.

History
A post office was established at Harveysburg in 1857 and remained in operation until it was discontinued in 1900. It was named for Harlan Harvey, an early settler.

Geography

References

Unincorporated communities in Fountain County, Indiana
Unincorporated communities in Indiana
1857 establishments in Indiana